Rostislav Šamánek (born 9 August 1989) is a Czech football player who currently plays for 1. FC Brno.

External links
 
 Guardian Football
 Profile at Vysočina Jihlava website

1989 births
Living people
Czech footballers
Czech First League players
FC Vysočina Jihlava players
FC Zbrojovka Brno players
Association football forwards